FC Eilenburg is a German association football club from the city of Eilenburg, Saxony.

History
The association was created 1 January 1994 as the successor side to Sportverein Mörtitz. The new club joined the Landesliga Sachsen (V) on the strength of SVs Bezirksliga Sachsen (VI) title. A poor 13th place finish immediately returned the side to sixth tier play where they would remain for three seasons. Playing now as FC Eilenburg, the team captured its second Berzirksliga championship in 1997 to advance to the Landesliga Sachsen (V). A Landesliga championship in 2004 saw the club promoted to the NOFV-Oberliga Süd (IV) where in their first two seasons of play they earned consecutive 12th place finishes. In 2007, FC earned its best result to date time by finishing third but was relegated back to the Sachsenliga in 2009 where it played until the 2016–17, gaining promotion back to the NOFV-Oberliga Süd, the fifth tier of German football.

Stadium
The club plays its home matches at the Ilburg-Stadion which was opened on 27 June 1997. The stadium has a capacity of 5,600 with 443 seats, of which 253 are covered.

 Honours Sachsenliga 
 Champions: 2003–04, 2016–17
 Runners-up: 2013–14Berzirksliga Leipzig Champions:''' 1992–93 (as Sportverein Mörtitz)'', 1996–97

Current squad

Management team 
{|class="wikitable"
|-
!Position
!Staff
|-
|Head coach|| Nico Knaubel
|-
|Assistant head coach|| Frank Thiele
|-
|Goalkeeper coach|| René Koslowski
|-
|rowspan="2"|Physiotherapists|| Thomas Süß
|-
| Gabriele Sauer
|-
|Team manager|| Eckhard Hohlfeld
|-

References

External links
Official team site
Das deutsche Fußball-Archiv historical German football league tables (in German)
The Abseits Guide to German Soccer

Football clubs in Germany
Football clubs in East Germany
Football clubs in Saxony
Association football clubs established in 1994
1994 establishments in Germany
FC Eilenburg